The Dragon from Russia is a 1990 Hong Kong martial arts action film directed by Clarence Fok and based on the Japanese manga Crying Freeman and written by Kazuo Koike and Ryoichi Ikegami, and also produced by Dean Shek, and starring Sam Hui, Maggie Cheung, Nina Li Chi, Carrie Ng, Loletta Lee and guest starring Shek in his second-to-last film appearance before retiring from acting in two years later.

Plot
Yao Lung and May Yip are orphans who live in Russia with their adoptive family. Through the years, the two fall in love and promise that they will be together forever. One fateful day, Yao witnesses a murder being committed by a mysterious assassin. Shortly after this, he is captured and brainwashed by a mysterious cult of assassins that call themselves "800 Dragons".
After losing his memory of his past, he is forced to take very strict martial arts training to become the perfect assassin for the 800 Dragons.

During one of his missions, Yao is seen by May, his past lover who is still looking for him. The code of the 800 Dragons is that anyone who sees an assassin during their mission needs to be killed. But Yao begin to remember his past when May talks to him about their past relationship. Yao decides to follow his heart instead of the strict code of the assassin by not killing May. Now Yao and May must run for their lives. Knowing that Yao fails to follow the order, the 800 Dragons are now trying to kill both of them.

Cast
 Sam Hui as Yao Lung
 Maggie Cheung as May Yip
 Nina Li Chi as Chimer
 Carrie Ng as Huntress
 Loletta Lee as Pearl
 Dean Shek as Snooker (guest star)
 Suen Hing as Officer Sunny
 Yuen Tak as Teddy Wong / Master of Death
 Pai Ying as Frankie
 Lau Shun as Mr. Kishudi
 Ann Mui as May
 Sarah Lee as Queenie

DVD release
On 24 February 2003, the movie was released by Hong Kong Legends in Europe as a Region 2 DVD.

Ten months later, Hong Kong Legends DVD were released on 29 December 2003 in a 3 disc set Manga in Motion including two other martial arts films: Story of Ricky and City Hunter.

References

External links

1990 films
1990 action films
1990 martial arts films
Hong Kong martial arts films
1990s Cantonese-language films
Films about amnesia
Films about contract killing
Films about orphans
Films directed by Clarence Fok
Films set in Hong Kong
Films set in Moscow
Films set on trains
Films shot in Hong Kong
Films shot in Moscow
Live-action films based on manga
1990s Hong Kong films